Anacithara naufraga is a species of sea snail, a marine gastropod mollusc in the family Horaiclavidae.

Description
The length of the shell attains 6 mm, its diameter 2.3 mm.

(Original description) The solid, cream-colored shell is narrowly fusiform. It contains seven whorls, including a small, smooth, two-whorled protoconch. The sculpture shows about eight prominent curved ribs that undulate the suture, and extend to the base. These are divided by broad and gently sloping interstices. Across both ribs and furrows run fine, close, spiral threads, amounting to 32 to 36 on the body whorl, and about onehalf that number on the penultimate whorl. Between the threads are microscopic radial bars. The aperture is oval, the anterior notch not apparent. The outer lip is protected by a strong rib-varix. The siphonal canal is short.

Distribution
This marine species is endemic to Australia and occurs off Queensland.

References

External links
  Hedley, C. 1922. A revision of the Australian Turridae. Records of the Australian Museum 13(6): 213–359, pls 42–56
  Tucker, J.K. 2004 Catalog of recent and fossil turrids (Mollusca: Gastropoda). Zootaxa 682:1–1295.

naufraga
Gastropods of Australia
Gastropods described in 1909